2K is an American video game publisher based in Novato, California. The company was founded under Take-Two Interactive in January 2005 through the 2K Games and 2K Sports labels, following Take-Two Interactive's acquisition of Visual Concepts that same month. A third label, 2K Play, was added in September 2007. Notable franchises include BioShock, Borderlands, Carnival Games, Mafia, NBA 2K, Sid Meier's Civilization, WWE 2K and XCOM.

Games published

Expansion packs

Notes

Games re-released

References 

 
2K